Futuro Bem Próximo Atlético Clube, commonly known as Futuro Bem Próximo, is a Brazilian football club based in Rio de Janeiro, Rio de Janeiro state.

History
The club was founded on September 6, 2000, in Niterói, eventually moving is headquarters to Campo Grande neighborhood, Rio de Janeiro.

Stadium

Futuro Bem Próximo Atlético Clube play their home games at Estádio Ítalo del Cima. The stadium has a maximum capacity of 18,000 people.

References

Association football clubs established in 2000
Football clubs in Rio de Janeiro (state)
2000 establishments in Brazil